The 2019 Canad Inns Women's Classic was held from October 17 to 20 at the Portage Curling Club in Portage la Prairie, Manitoba as part of the World Curling Tour. The event was held in a triple-knockout format with a purse of $60,000.

In the final, Elena Stern of Switzerland defeated Rachel Homan of Ottawa, Ontario by stealing one in an extra end to claim the title.

Teams
The teams are listed as follows:

Knockout brackets

Source:

A event

B event

C event

Knockout results
All draw times listed in Central Time.

Draw 1
Thursday, October 17, 10:00 am

Draw 2
Thursday, October 17, 1:30 pm

Draw 3
Thursday, October 17, 5:00 pm

Draw 4
Thursday, October 17, 8:30 pm

Draw 5
Friday, October 18, 10:00 am

Draw 6
Friday, October 18, 1:30 pm

Draw 7
Friday, October 18, 5:00 pm

Draw 8
Friday, October 18, 8:30 pm

Draw 9
Saturday, October 19, 10:00 am

Draw 10
Saturday, October 19, 1:30 pm

Draw 11
Saturday, October 19, 5:00 pm

Draw 12
Saturday, October 19, 8:30 pm

Playoffs

Source:

Quarterfinals
Sunday, October 20, 10:00 am

Semifinals
Sunday, October 20, 2:00 pm

Final
Sunday, October 20, 6:00 pm

References

External links
CurlingZone

2019 in Canadian curling
2019 in Manitoba
October 2019 sports events in Canada
2019 in women's curling
Sport in Portage la Prairie